Taschereau Boulevard is a major suburban boulevard located on the south shore of Montreal, Quebec, Canada. It is a section of Quebec Route 134 and runs from Longueuil to Candiac (junction of Autoroute 15). It is named after the prominent Quebec family, which included former Premier Louis-Alexandre Taschereau. At , it is one of the longest commercial arteries in Canada. It serves the heart of an area with an estimated population of 400,000.

Between its approach near the Jacques-Cartier Bridge and the Quebec Route 112 and Quebec Route 116 expressway, which links Longueuil with the Saint-Hubert and Saint-Bruno sectors, Route 134 is a six-lane expressway with interchanges to local areas within Longueuil and LeMoyne. In some sections, it is designed as a right-in/right-out freeway with at-grade intersections on the municipality-maintained (usually right) line to local streets from one side of the highway.

Taschereau Interchange
At the intersection of Taschereau Boulevard and Autoroute 10, a construction project was undertaken in 2002 to reorganize the entry and exit ramps. This project is planned to continue well into 2008. This project also intends to allow the traffic to pass through the centre of the interchange, to reduce noise pollution through sound barriers, to allow a bus lane (and later a light railway transit system) to access RTL bus terminals without affecting highway or road traffic.

Points of interest
Charles LeMoyne Hospital
Carnaval Mall
Champlain Mall
Place Greenfield Park
Terminus Panama

References

Roads in Longueuil
Transport in Brossard
La Prairie, Quebec
Roads in Montérégie
Shopping districts and streets in Canada
1932 in transport
1932 establishments in Quebec